Southport and Formby District General Hospital is an acute hospital at Kew in Southport, Merseyside. It is managed by the Southport and Ormskirk Hospital NHS Trust.

History
The hospital, which replaced the Southport General Infirmary and the Southport Promenade Hospital, opened in September 1988. A major expansion of the accident and emergency department was commissioned in February 2018.

References

NHS hospitals in England
Hospital buildings completed in 1988
Hospitals in Merseyside
1988 establishments in England